Alix Angèle Marguerite Aymé (Marseille 1894 - 1989) was a female French painter who lived in China and Vietnam.

Life
Born Alix Angèle Marguerite Hava, she first married in 1920 Professor Paul de Fautereau-Vassel, moving with him to Shanghai, China then Hanoi, Vietnam. In 1925-1926 she taught drawing at the French Lycée in Hanoi.

The couple returned to France, where they lived from 1926 to 1928 and had a son. Then she separated from Fautereau-Vassel and returned with her infant son to Indochina. In 1931 she remarried to Colonel, later General, Georges Aymé,  future deputy to Lieutenant-General :fr:Eugène Mordant, in command of the French Army in Indochina, and whose younger brother Marcel Aymé was later be known as a novelist. She travelled and painted also in Laos, becoming acquainted with the household of King Sisavang Vong, and her large frescos were displayed in the Royal Palace, Luang Prabang. She became teacher at EBAI where she contributed to a reawakening of interest in lacquer painting.

An exhibition of her work was held at the Johns Hopkins University in 2012 who described her as "an influential participant in the promotion of Paris-born modernism in the era between the world wars." The exhibition documented the artist's development over nearly four decades, from early works influenced by the Nabi painter Maurice Denis, to later adoption of Asian elements and modernism in her mature landscapes.

Notes

References

1894 births
1989 deaths
20th-century French painters
Artists from Marseille
French expatriates in China
French people in colonial Vietnam